Thomas Theodore Crittenden Jr. (December 23, 1863 – July 31, 1938) was the Mayor of Kansas City, Missouri from 1907 to 1910.

Early life
Thomas Theodore Crittenden Jr. was born on December 23, 1863, near Springfield, Illinois. His father was Missouri Governor Thomas Theodore Crittenden. He was the great-grandson of John Crittenden Sr.; grandnephew of John Jordan Crittenden and Robert Crittenden. He was raised in Warrensburg, Missouri and graduated from the public schools in Warrensburg. He graduated from University of Missouri in Columbia in 1883 and moved to Kansas City, Missouri in 1884.

Career
After moving to Kansas City, Crittenden got into the real estate business. He was appointed deputy clerk of the Court of Appeals. In 1894, Crittenden was elected as a Democrat as clerk of the Court of Appeals

Crittenden served as Mayor of Kansas City from 1907 to 1910.

Personal life
Crittenden married Jennie Mason Rogers on January 5, 1888. They had a daughter and two sons, including Joseph R. and Mason A.

Crittenden died on July 31, 1938, in Kansas City. Crittenden was buried at Forest Hill Calvary Cemetery in Kansas City.

References

External links

1863 births
1938 deaths
Politicians from Springfield, Illinois
University of Missouri alumni
Mayors of Kansas City, Missouri
Crittenden family
Missouri Democrats